Ben Price (born 30 June 1972) is a British actor, director and writer. He has played the role of Nick Tilsley in the ITV soap opera Coronation Street and has made four films as a writer/director, the first of which, I'm Sorry To Tell You, was BAFTA-shortlisted.

Early life
Price grew up in Newcastle upon Tyne, where he attended Gosforth East Middle School and Gosforth High School before taking acting classes at the Live Theatre. He then attended London's Drama Centre and graduated from the Central School of Speech and Drama in 1996.

Career
Price started his career at the Manchester Royal Exchange, and went on to appear at the Bush in London, the Gate in Dublin and Sheffield Crucible among others. He made his first appearance on television, in a 1996 episode of Casualty, before guest roles in Soldier Soldier, Heartbeat, Peak Practice, and an episode of the Australian soap opera, Home and Away, in 1998, when the show filmed a storyline in England.

After starring in Wire in the Blood, he played Conrad Gates,  captain of Earl's Park football team, in the British television series Footballers' Wives. After leaving the show at the end of the fourth series, he went on to appear in Dancing at Lughnassa at the Gate theatre, Dublin.

He co-stars in the horror film Blood Trails, which won the audience award for best feature at the Dead by Dawn International Horror Film Festival 2006 in Edinburgh.

He returned to Casualty and starred as corporate director Nathan Spencer between 2005 and 2007, and was recently voted one of the ten actors most likely to succeed in Hollywood by Stage and Screen magazine. Price appeared on the July 2006 cover of Out magazine.

In 2009 he appeared in the third season of showtimes hit show The Tudors, playing the martyr John Lambert.

Price joined Coronation Street as Nick Tilsley in 2009. He began filming on 19 October 2009 and was seen on screen for the first time on 21 December 2009.

Ben's first 4 films have played at over 60 International Film festivals, 25 of which were BAFTA- or Academy-qualifying. His first short, "I'm Sorry To Tell You",  was shortlisted at BAFTA  and is distributed worldwide by Shorts International. His second film, "Taubman", was shown at the Oscar-qualifying Athens Film Festival, opened the Manchester film festival and was shown as part of a special section at the BAFTA qualifying Jewish Film Festival. His latest film, “Hope Dies Last”, is part of the British Film Council short support scheme. BAFTA- and Oscar-qualified, it is currently touring the international festival circuit.  In 2020 he filmed "3 Minutes of Silence" funded by the BFI and starring Bella Ramsey and Molly Wright.  It's gone onto International recognition and has formed the basis for a Feature Film funded by the BFI.

On 27 January 2017 it was announced he would be leaving the role of Nick Tilsley in Coronation Street later in 2017. On 23 April 2018 it was announced Price would be returning to Coronation Street in summer 2018 and would appear on screen from autumn 2018 following a year away from the role.

Price has a podcast called Sofa Cinema Club with Coronation Street co-actors Jack P. Shepherd and Colson Smith.

Personal life
Price married Alexandra Wheeler in 2005. The marriage resulted in 2 children, and it was revealed on the TikTok podcast he shares with Jack P. Shepherd who plays on screen brother David Platt and Colson Smith who plays on screen as Craig Tinker, that his sons name is Max.

Filmography

Films

Television

Stage

Awards and nominations

References

External links
 

1972 births
Alumni of the Royal Central School of Speech and Drama
English male television actors
English male soap opera actors
Living people
People from Gosforth
Male actors from Tyne and Wear
People educated at Gosforth Academy
Male actors from Newcastle upon Tyne
20th-century English male actors
21st-century English male actors